In number theory the Agoh–Giuga conjecture on the Bernoulli numbers Bk postulates that p is a prime number if and only if 

 

It is named after Takashi Agoh and Giuseppe Giuga.

Equivalent formulation
The conjecture as stated above is due to Takashi Agoh (1990); an equivalent formulation is due to Giuseppe Giuga, from 1950, to the effect that p is prime if and only if

which may also be written as

It is trivial to show that p being prime is sufficient for the second equivalence to hold, since if p is prime, Fermat's little theorem states that

Status
The statement is still a conjecture since it has not yet been proven that if a number n is not prime (that is, n is composite), then the formula does not hold. It has been shown that a composite number n satisfies the formula if and only if it is both a Carmichael number and a Giuga number, and that if such a number exists, it has at least 13,800 digits (Borwein, Borwein, Borwein, Girgensohn 1996). Laerte Sorini, finally, in a work of 2001 showed that a possible counterexample should be a number n greater than  1036067 which represents the limit suggested by Bedocchi for the demonstration technique specified by Giuga to his own conjecture.

Relation to Wilson's theorem
The Agoh–Giuga conjecture bears a similarity to Wilson's theorem, which has been proven to be true. Wilson's theorem states that a number p is prime if and only if

which may also be written as

For an odd prime p we have

and for p=2 we have

So, the truth of the Agoh–Giuga conjecture combined with Wilson's theorem would give: a number p is prime if and only if
 

and

References

 
 
 
 

Conjectures about prime numbers
Unsolved problems in number theory